is a Japanese politician of the Democratic Party of Japan, a member of the House of Councillors in the Diet (national legislature).

Overview 

A native of Sendai, Miyagi, he attended Tokyo Medical and Dental University as an undergraduate and received a Ph.D. in medicine from Tohoku University. He was elected to the House of Councillors for the first time in 2004. He was made Deputy Treasury Minister in 2010.

References

External links 
 Official website in Japanese.

Members of the House of Councillors (Japan)
Tokyo Medical and Dental University alumni
Tohoku University alumni
Living people
1956 births
People from Sendai
Democratic Party of Japan politicians